A CD single (sometimes abbreviated to CDS) is a music single in the form of a compact disc. The standard in the Red Book for the term CD single is an 8 cm (3-inch) CD (or Mini CD). It now refers to any single recorded onto a CD of any size, particularly the CD5, or 5-inch CD single. The format was introduced in the mid-1980s but did not gain its place in the market until the early 1990s. With the rise in digital downloads in the early 2010s, sales of CD singles have decreased.

Commercially released CD singles can vary in length from two songs (an A side and B side, in the tradition of 7-inch 45-rpm records) up to six songs like an EP. Some contain multiple mixes of one or more songs (known as remixes), in the tradition of 12-inch vinyl singles, and in some cases, they may also contain a music video for the single itself (this is an enhanced CD) as well as occasionally a poster. Depending on the nation, there may be limits on the number of songs and total length for sales to count in singles charts.

History
CD singles were first made eligible for the UK Singles Chart in 1987, and the first number 1 available on the format in that country was "I Wanna Dance with Somebody (Who Loves Me)" by Whitney Houston in May 1987.

The Mini CD single CD3 format was originally created for use for singles in the late 1980s, but met with limited success, particularly in the US. The smaller CDs were more successful in Japan and had a resurgence in Europe early this century, marketed as "Pock it" CDs, being small enough to fit in a shirt pocket. By 1989, the CD3 was in decline in the US (replaced by the 5-inch CD single, called CD-5).

It was common in the 1990s for US record companies to release both a two-track CD and a multi-track (usually "remix") maxi CD. In the UK, record companies would also release two CDs but, usually, these consisted of three tracks or more each.

During the 1990s, CD single releases became less common in certain countries and were often released in smaller editions, as the major record labels feared they were cannibalizing the sales of higher-profit-margin CD albums. Pressure from record labels made singles charts in some countries become song charts, allowing album cuts to chart based only on airplay, without a single ever being released. In the US, the Billboard Hot 100 made this change in December 1998, after which very few songs were released in the CD single format in the US, but they remained extremely popular in the UK and other countries, where charts were still based solely on single sales and not radio airplay. At the end of the 1990s, the CD was the biggest-selling single format in the UK, but in the US, the dominant single format was airplay. With the advent of digital music sales, the CD single has largely been replaced as a distribution format in most countries, and most charts now include digital download counts as well as physical single sales.

In Australia, the Herald Sun reported the CD single is "set to become extinct". In early July 2009, leading music store JB Hi-Fi ceased stocking CD singles because of declining sales, with copies of the week's No. 1 single often selling as few as only 350 copies across all their stores nationwide. While CD singles no longer maintain their own section of the store, copies are still distributed but placed with the artist's albums. That is predominantly the case for popular Australian artists such as Jessica Mauboy, Kylie Minogue and, most recently, Delta Goodrem, whose then-recent singles ("What Happened to Us", "Put Your Hands Up (If You Feel Love)" and "Sitting on Top of the World" respectively) were released on CD in limited quantities. The ARIA Singles Chart is now "predominantly compiled from legal downloads", and ARIA also stopped compiling their physical singles sales chart. "On a Mission" by Gabriella Cilmi was the last CD single to be stocked in Kmart, Target and Big W, who then concluded stocking newly released singles. Sanity Entertainment, having resisted the decline for longer than the other major outlets, has also ceased selling CD singles.

In Germany, CD singles continue to be regularly issued by all major and some minor labels, and both of domestic and foreign artists.

In China and South Korea, CD single releases have been rare ever since the format was introduced, due of the amount of infringement and illegal file sharing over the internet, and most of the time singles have generally been album cuts chart based only on airplay, but with the advent of digital music the charts have also occasionally included digital download counts.

In Greece and Cyprus, the term "CD single" is used to describe an extended play (EP) in which there may be anywhere from three to six different tracks. These releases charted on the Greek Singles Chart (before it abandoned tracking altogether) with songs released as singles.

Mini CD

The original CD single (sometimes mini CD single or 3-inch CD or CD3 in the US) is a music single released on a mini Compact Disc that measures  in diameter, rather than the standard . They are manufactured using the same methods as standard full-size CDs, and can be played in most standard audio CD players and CD-ROM disc drives.

The format was first released in the United States, United Kingdom, Japan, France, West Germany, and Hong Kong in 1987 as the replacement for the 7-inch single. While mini CDs quickly fell out of popularity among most major record labels (partly due to their incompatibility with many slot-loading CD players), they lasted longer as a popular, low cost way for independent musicians and groups to release music.

Capable of holding up to 20 minutes of music, most mini CD singles contain at least two tracks, often consisting of a single edit and an instrumental version in the same way as 7-inch vinyl singles.

Japan
These were released in both a 5-inch size slim jewel case and long flip-out sleeve snap-packs. These sleeves could be 'snapped' and folded into a small 3-inch (8-cm) square, rather than the original  length when originally sold.

Beginning in 1999 some labels began to package mini CDs in 12 cm slimline cases. As the "tanzaku" sleeves slowly morphed into the use of slimline jewel cases, the mini CD single was haulted from production in the early 2000s.

As popularity diminished, one of the last Japanese 8 cm CD single released was a reissue and repackaging of "I Was Born to Love You" by Queen in 2004. Many of the artists who released 3-inch CDs are from that era, including Wink, Madonna, Phil Collins, Michael Jackson, Queen, U2, Prince, Metallica, Bros, Huey Lewis and the News, Bon Jovi, Kylie Minogue, Falco and George Michael. Some singles packaged in 5inch single jewel cases contained a 5-inch CD adapter.

Most were sold at around ¥1,000 (£6 or $9) at the time of release during the late 1980s, early 2000s to the present day.

However, there has been a small revival in the mini CD single with Japanese artists such as Hibari Misora with a reissue of her 1989 single "Kawa no Nagare no Yoni" in May 2019 in original long "tanzaku" form, by the record company Nippon Columbia.

United States
US versions were often packaged in cardboard slipcases, either 3-inch square or 6-inch by 3-inch gatefold. Others were released in 5-inch slimline single cases, which allowed an adapter to be included with the CD. At the time of first release in 1987, their retail price was between $4 and $6, at least $3 less than even the least-expensive 5-inch discs. Delos Records, a small, independent label, issued the first commercially available 3-inch CDs in 1987 with 20 classical and jazz titles. The Massachusetts-based Rykodisc issued Frank Zappa's “Peaches en Regalia” the first pop 3-inch CD. Initially when released, 300,000 of the discs were shipped to retail outlets. Noted oldies label Rhino had a series of over 60 3-inch CDs released throughout 1988 entitled "Lil' Bit Of Gold".

United Kingdom

In the United Kingdom, 3-inch CDs were made mostly in a small square case/cover form only, some including a 5-inch CD adapter to use in normal compact disc players. Although the format was not widely available in the United Kingdom, several artists have released singles in the format.

Technology

From a technical standpoint, a 3-inch CD follows the Red Book standard for CD digital audio. The major difference is that the smaller physical size of the disc allows for fewer data sectors, meaning the disc can store less audio. The majority of audio CD players and CD-ROM drives have a smaller circular indentation in the CD tray for holding these discs. Most slot-loading drives, such as those found in some car CD players, are unable to manipulate the smaller discs or their adapters. Laptop drives generally only require the centre hole to hold the disc so the smaller diameter is irrelevant. In fact, software and drivers for some hardware are provided on the 3-inch discs.

Longevity
In the United States and United Kingdom, the format barely lasted into the early 1990s, partly due to inconvenience of needing to attach an adapter on every disc (very few packages were issued with one) before playing. Sony remained in support of the 3-inch CD having had plans to launch a 3-inch CD player for the Japanese market in 1988.

It was largely replaced by simply putting less music on a regular full-size CD, at least among major labels.  The full-size discs are a more standard manufacturing process and so may end up being cheaper to press. The CD single format continued until 2000 for Japanese releases. Despite the unpopularity it survived with publishers adopting the 3-inch CD as an inexpensive way of presenting bonus material with books.

Technical specifications
Data: 185–210MiB (compared to 650–703MiB on a 12 cm CD)
Audio: 21–24 minutes (compared to 74–80 minutes on a 12 cm CD)

The slim jewel boxes used for 3-inch CDs are nearly the same size as 3.5-inch floppy disks, making storage boxes for 3.5-inch floppies usable for 3-inch CDs as well.

CD single sales in the United Kingdom

In September 2003, there was talk of ringtones for mobile phones outstripping CD singles sales for the year 2004.

Woolworths Group, which previously accounted for one third of all CD sales in the country, stopped selling CD singles in August 2008, citing the "terminal decline" of the format as customers moved to digital downloads as their preferred method of purchasing single tracks (the Woolworths chain itself would collapse the following November).

In July 2009, The Guardian reported that Florence + The Machine's single 'Rabbit Heart (Raise It Up)' sold a CD and 7inch vinyl combined total of 64 copies, where it reached number 16 in the Mid-Week Chart.

In March 2011, Mercury Records announced that they were to stop manufacturing CD singles for lack of demand and loss of money on the format in 2010.

As of 2012, selected HMV stores sold a small selection of CD singles, mostly charity releases and acts from The X Factor.

'Bad Habits' by Ed Sheeran was the best-selling CD single as of September 2021 with 11,000 copies.

See also
Single
Radio single
A-side and B-side
EP
Maxi single
Digital download

References

Compact disc
Single types
Audiovisual introductions in 1985